Erich Lessing (13 July 1923 – 29 August 2018) was an Austrian photographer. Lessing became a full member of Magnum Photos in 1955 and was a contributor since 1979. His portraits of poets, musicians, physicists and astronomers were published in around 60 books.

Career
Lessing was born in Vienna into a Jewish family, the son of a dentist and a concert pianist. Before completing high school he was forced to leave Austria in 1939 because of Hitler's rise to power. He immigrated to the British Mandate for Palestine (now Israel). His mother remained in Vienna and later was murdered at Auschwitz. While in Israel Lessing studied radio engineering at the  Technion and then worked agricultural jobs on kibbutzim. He then joined the British Army as a photographer and aviator.

After World War II, Lessing returned to Austria in 1947 and joined the Associated Press. David Seymour invited Lessing to join Magnum Photos in 1951 and Lessing became a full member in 1955. His photographs were published in Time, Fortune, Life, Paris Match, Picture Post, Epoca and Quick. He documented politics in post-war Europe, especially in Communist countries.

In the 1960s, Lessing turned to more cultural subjects such as art, science, and history, by taking portraits of poets, musicians, physicists, and astronomers. With these photographs, Lessing produced around 60 books.

Lessing taught in Arles, France, at the Venice Biennale, at the Salzburg Summer Academy, and at the Academy of Applied Arts in Vienna. His work has been exhibited throughout the world.

In 2013 he donated 60,000 images to the archives of the Austrian National Library.

Personal life
Lessing was married to the Time journalist Traudl Lessing until her death in 2016. Together they had three children, four grandchildren, and one great-grandson. Lessing later married Renée Kronfuss-Lessing, a psychotherapist. He lived in Vienna, Austria.

Lessing died in August 2018.

Publications
Szene (Scene). Vienna, Austria: :de:Österreichische Staatsdruckerei, 1954. 
Imago Austriae
Imago Austriae. Freiburg im Breisgau, Austria: Herder, 1963. Edited by Otto Schulmeister, Johann Christoph Allmeyer-Beck and Lessing. 
Freiburg im Breisgau. Austria: Herder, 1967. 
1964 Die Wiener Schatzkammer, Hallwag, Switzerland
The Voyages of Ulysses
1965 Die Odyssee. Herder, Deutschland
1966 The Voyages of Ulysses. MacMillan, United Kingdom
The Adventures of Ulysses: Homer's Epic in Pictures. New York: Dodd Mead, 1970. .
1970 Las Aventuras de Ulises. Herder, Spain
1970 De Avonturen van Odysseus. Becht, The Netherlands
1966 De Odyssee, Becht. The Netherlands
1969 Die Abenteuer des Odysseus. Herder, Deutschland
1969 Odysséen. Allhems Förlag, Sweden.
1966 Römisches Erinnerungsbuch (Roman memoirs). Herder, Germany
1967 Entdecker des Weltraums (Explorers of outer space). Herder, Germany
The Story of Noah
1968 Die Arche Noah. Molden, Austria
1968 The Story of Noah. Time Life, USA
1968 Het Verhall van Noach. Elsevier, The Netherlands
1968 Berättelsen om Noa. Norstedt & Söners Förlag, Schweden
Rome Remembered
1969 Reminiscenze Romane. Edizioni Paoline, Italy
1969 Rome Remembered. Burns & Oates, United Kingdom / Herder & Herder, USA
1969 Discoverers of Space. Burns & Oates, United Kingdom / Herder & Herder, USA
The Bible.
1969 Die Bibel. Die Geschichte Israels und seines Glaubens, Herder, Germany
1969 Verité et Poésie de la Bible (Poetry and Truth of the Bible). Hatier, France
1969 Verità e poesia della Bibbia. Edizioni Paoline, Italy
The Bible: History and Culture of a People. A Pictorial narration. Freiburg im Breisgau, Germany: Herder and Herder, 1970. .
1969 Deutsche Reise (German Travel). Ein Erinnerungsbuch, Herder, Germany
1969 Die Wiener Oper (The Vienna Opera). Molden, Austria
1970 Musik in Wien. Molden, Austria
1971 Ravenna. Steine reden, Herder, Germany
1971 Der Mann aus Galiläa (The Man of Galilee). Herder, Germany
Jesus. History & Culture Of The New Testament
1971 Jesus. History & Culture Of The New Testament. Herder & Herder, USA
1971 De man van Nazareth. Becht, The Netherlands
The Spanish Riding School of Vienna
1972 Die Spanische Hofreitschule zu Wien. Molden, Austria
1972 The Spanish Riding School of Vienna. Molden, Austria
1972 La Haute Ecole Espagnole de Vienne. Albin Michel, France
1972 De Spaanse rijschool in Wenen. C.A.J. van Dishoeck, Belgium
1973 Traumstraßen durch Deutschland (Dream Roads Germany). Molden, Austria
1974 Die K & K Armee (The K & K army). Bertelsmann, Germany.
1975 Das Schönste aus der Spanischen Hofreitschule (The best of the Spanish Riding School). Molden, Austria
1975 L’Opéra de Paris, Hatier, France
Deutsche Ritter, Deutsche Burgen. By Lessing and Werner Meyer.
Germany: Bertelsmann, 1976.
1999. .
1976 Gott sprach zu Abraham (God said to Abraham). Herder, Germany.
1976 Le Message de l‘Espérance (The Message of Hope). Hatier, France.
1977 Die Griechischen Sagen (The Greek Legends), Bertelsmann, Germany
On The Roads of France
1978 Traumstraße Donau (Dream Roads Danube). Molden, Austria.
1978 Traumstraßen durch Frankreich (Dream Roads France), Molden, Austria
1978 Sur Les Routes de France (On The Roads of France), Arthaud, France
1978 Die kaiserlichen Kriegsvölker (The Imperial War Peoples), Bertelsmann, Germany
The Celts
1978 Les Celts, Hatier, France
1979 Die Kelten, Herder, Germany
1979 De Kelten, Standaard Uitgeverij, The Netherlands
1979 Ludwig van Beethoven, Herder, Germany
1980 Deutsche Schlösser, Deutsche Fürsten, Bertelsmann, Germany
The Travels of Saint Paul
1980 Paulus, Herder, Germany
1982 Paulus - Der Völkerapostel, Herder, Germany
1980 Les voyages de Saint Paul, Hatier, France
1980 Saint Paul, Becht, The Netherlands
1980 The Travels of Saint Paul, Herder & Herder, USA
1980 Hallstatt. Bilder aus der Frühzeit Europas, Jugend & Volk, Austria
1980 Hausbibel, Herder, Germany
1980 Wolfgang Amadeus Mozart, Herder, Germany
1981 Joseph Haydn, Herder, Germany
Das Heer unter dem Doppeladler (The army under the double-headed eagle). Germany: Bertelsmann, 1981.
1982 Die Donau, Ringier, Germany
1983 Das Wiener Rathaus, Jugend & Volk, Austria
The Italian Renaissance
1983 Die Italienische Renaissance, Bertelsmann, Germany
1985 La Renaissance Italienne, Hatier, France
1985 Die Niederlande, Bertelsmann, Germany
1987 Die Bibel. Das Alte Testament in Bildern erzählt von Erich Lessing (The Bible. The Old Testament narrative in pictures), Bertelsmann, Germany
1987 Der Wiener Musikverein, J & V Edition Wien, Austria
Greece
1987 La Grece, Payot, France
1988 Griechenland, Kohlhammer, Germany
1989 Die Geschichte Frankreichs (The History of France), Bertelsmann, Germany
1989 Edles Porzellan, Falken, Germany
Immortal Egypt
1990 Geheimnisvolles Ägypten, Bechtermünz, Germany
1990 Immortelle Egypte, Nathan, France
1991 Les mythes grecs, Nathan, France
Florence and the Renaissance
1992 Florence et la Renaissance, Terrail, France
1993 Florence and the Renaissance, Terrail, France
1993 Florenz und seine Kunst im 15. Jahrhundert, Terrail, France
Glory of Venice
1993 La Gloire de Venise, Terrail, France
1994 Glory of Venice, Terrail, France
1994 Venedig, Glanz und Glorie, Terrail, France
1994 Karl Friedrich Schinkel: An Architecture for Prussia, Rizzoli International, USA
Femmes mythologies
1994 Femmes mythologies, Imprimerie nationale, France
Femmes mythologies. France: Imprimerie nationale, 1994. .
1994 Frauen-Mythologie, Metamorphosis, Germany
Pomeii
1995 Pompéi, Terrail, France
Pomeii Vilo International, 1996. .
2001 Pompeji, Komet, Germany
1998 Dieux de l'Egypte (Gods of Egypt), Imprimerie nationale, France
2000 Das Heilige Land: Landschaften, Archäologie, Religion, Orbis, Germany
2000 Dieu en ses Anges, Cerf, France
2000 Rückblende - Geschichten aus der Welt vor 1000 Jahren, Wieser, Austria
Arresting Time: Erich Lessing, Reportage Photography, 1948-1973
2002 Vom Festhalten der Zeit - Reportage-Fotografie 1948-1973, Brandstätter, Austria
2003 Mémoire du Temps - Photographies de Reportage 1948-1973, Hazan, France
Arresting Time: Erich Lessing, Reportage Photography, 1948-1973 by Alistair Crawford. USA: Quantuck Lane, 2005. .
Louvre - The Arts Face to Face
2003 Au Louvre - Les Arts Face à Face, Hazan, France
2003 Louvre - The Arts Face to Face, Hazan, France
2003 Un Certain Louvre, Biro Éditeur, France
From Liberation to Liberty
2005 Von der Befreiung zur Freiheit, Verlag der Metamorphosen, Austria
2005 From Liberation to Liberty, Verlag der Metamorphosen, Austria
1001 Paintings of the Louvre
2005 1001 peintures du Louvre: De l'Antiquité au XIXe siècle. 5 Continents Editions, Italy / Louvre, France
2006 1001 Gemälde des Louvre. 5 Continents Editions, Italy / Michael Imhof Verlag, Germany
Revolution in Hungary, The 1956 Budapest Uprising
Revolution in Hungary, The 1956 Budapest Uprising. Thames & Hudson, 2006. .
2006 Budapest 1956 - Die Ungarische Revolution, Brandstätter, Austria
2006 Budapest 1956 - la Révolution, Biro Éditeur, France
2006 Budapest 1956 - la rivoluzione, Marietti 1820, Italy
2006 Budapest 1956 - a forradalom, 1956-os Intézet, Hungary
2007 Naissance de la figure, Hazan, France
2008 Herbert von Karajan, Verlag der Metamorphosen, Austria / Böhlau, Austria
Joseph Haydn - His Time Told in Pictures
2009 Joseph Haydn - His time told in pictures, Verlag der Metamorphosen, Austria
2009 Joseph Haydn und seine Zeit in Bildern, Verlag der Metamorphosen, Austria / Braumüller, Austria
2010 Menschenbilder aus der Dunkelkammer, Verlag Thomas Reche, Germany
2011 Václav Havel. Fünfzehn Stimmungen, Verlag Thomas Reche, Germany
The Louvre - All the paintings
2011 The Louvre - All the paintings. Black Dog & Leventhal, USA
2011 Louvre - Tutti i dipinti, Electra, Italy
2012 Le Louvre - Toutes les peintures, Flammarion / Éditions du Louvre, France
2012 Louvre - Alle Gemälde, Dumont, Germany
2014 Anderswo, Nimbus. Kunst und Bücher, Switzerland
2014 Von der Befreiung zur Freiheit - Österreich nach 1945, Tyrolia, Austria
2015 Ungarn 1956, Tyrolia, Austria

Awards

1956: American Art Editors´ Award for his work during the Hungarian Revolution.
1966: Prix Nadar for his book The Voyages of Ulysses.
1970: Austrian Karl Renner prize for outstanding cultural achievements.
1976: Culture-Award of the city of Vienna.
1992: Vienna's silver medal for outstanding services to the city.
1992: Imre Nagy medal from the President of Hungary for his work during the Hungarian revolution.
1997: Golden Medal from the governor of Syria.
1997: “Grosser Österreichischer Staatspreis”.
2013: Austrian Cross of Honor for Science and Art

References

External links

Lessing at Magnum Photos

1923 births
2018 deaths
Austrian Jews
Austrian photographers
Magnum photographers
Austrian expatriates in Mandatory Palestine
Photographers from Vienna